The 2018 Judo Grand Prix The Hague was held at the Sportcampus Zuiderpark in The Hague, Netherlands, from 16 to 18 November 2018.

Medal summary

Men's events

Women's events

Source Results

Medal table

References

External links
 

2018 IJF World Tour
2018 Judo Grand Prix
Judo
Judo competitions in the Netherlands
Judo
Judo